Major earthquakes in the Caribbean are infrequent and are sometimes accompanied by tsunami.

Earthquakes

See also
List of earthquakes in Cuba
List of earthquakes in the Dominican Republic
List of earthquakes in Haiti
List of earthquakes in Puerto Rico

References

Sources

Further reading
 

Megan Torpey Zimmerman; Bingming Shen‐Tu; Khosrow Shabestari; Mehrdad Mahdyiar Bulletin of the Seismological Society of America (2022) 112 (2): 1120–1148. https://doi.org/10.1785/0120210157

External links

Caribbean
Earthquakes